Lööne is a village in Saaremaa Parish, Saare County, Estonia, on the island of Saaremaa. As of 2011 Census, the settlement's population was 28.

Lööne Manor is located in the village.

References

Villages in Saare County